Western Times may refer to:

 Western Times (Exeter) - newspaper published in Exeter, Devon, England from 1829 to 1952
 The Bathurst Free Press and Mining Journal - Australian newspaper in Bathurst, New South Wales, published as the Western Times between 1936 and 1963